Mar de Cristal is a station on Line 4 and Line 8 of the Madrid Metro. It is located in fare Zone A.

References 

Line 4 (Madrid Metro) stations
Line 8 (Madrid Metro) stations
Railway stations in Spain opened in 1998
Buildings and structures in Hortaleza District, Madrid